Emanuele Panzeri (born 31 March 1993) is an Italian footballer.

Biography
Born in Carate Brianza, Lombardy, Panzeri started his career at Legnano. He then left for Novara. On 10 November 2012 he made his Serie B debut as a substitute of Masahudu Alhassan.

On 29 January 2013 Panzeri was signed by South Tyrol in a temporary deal.

In summer 2013 he was signed by Venezia. On 23 January 2015 Panzeri and Raffaele Franchini were signed by Pordenone, with Maurizio Peccarisi and Gaetano Capogrosso moved to opposite direction .

Representative teams
Panzeri was a member of Italy Lega Pro representative teams in 2013–15 International Challenge Trophy. He also played in a friendly match against Korea.

References

External links
 AIC profile (data by football.it) 

1993 births
Living people
People from Carate Brianza
Italian footballers
A.C. Legnano players
Novara F.C. players
F.C. Südtirol players
Venezia F.C. players
Pordenone Calcio players
Serie B players
Serie C players
Association football defenders
Footballers from Lombardy
Sportspeople from the Province of Monza e Brianza